Lamia River is a river in western Uganda in Bundibugyo District. It flows near the Semuliki National Park.

References

Rivers of Uganda